Biribellus is a genus of beetles in the family Cerambycidae, containing the following species:

 Biribellus huedepohli (Galileo, 1987)
 Biribellus isabelae Santos-Silva, Hernandez & Galileo 2018
 Biribellus martinsi Galileo, 1987
 Biribellus punctatus Galileo, 1987

References

Prioninae